John Frederick "Fred" Small (July 15, 1963 – June 24, 2003) was a professional American football player who played for the Pittsburgh Steelers of the National Football League (NFL) in 1985.

Born and raised in Los Angeles, Small graduated from John C. Fremont High School in 1981. He played college football at the University of Washington in Seattle under head coach Don James.  An outside linebacker in his senior season in 1984, the Huskies won the Orange Bowl and were second in the final rankings. Small was selected in the ninth round of the 1985 NFL Draft by the Steelers.

After leaving football, he became a police officer in southern California and joined the Inglewood Police Department in 1998. While on duty on his police motorcycle, he was involved in a late night three-vehicle collision on the Pomona Freeway, and died from his injuries at age 39 at Pomona Valley Hospital. He was survived by his wife and four children.

References

External links
 
 California Peace Officers Memorial – John F. Small
 Officer Down Memorial – Police Officer John Frederick Lee "Fred" Small
 

1963 births
2003 deaths
American football linebackers
Pittsburgh Steelers players
Washington Huskies football players
Players of American football from Los Angeles
Road incident deaths in California